Tom Benson (26 August 1929 – 24 December 2000) was an Ulster Unionist Party (UUP) politician who was a Member of the Northern Ireland Assembly (MLA) for Strangford from 1998 to 2000. 

Born in Enniskillen, Benson was an officer in the Royal Ulster Constabulary.  He joined the Ulster Unionist Party (UUP) and was elected to Ards Borough Council, serving as Mayor of Ards from 1987–88.  During this year, he defied a ban on UUP representatives meeting Government ministers and met the Secretary of State for Northern Ireland Tom King.

In 1996, Benson was elected to the Northern Ireland Forum representing Strangford, and he held his seat at the 1998 Northern Ireland Assembly election.  He fell ill in November 2000 and died the following month.  He was the first member of the Assembly to die, and was replaced by Thomas Hamilton, his hand-picked successor.

References

1929 births
2000 deaths
Members of the Northern Ireland Forum
Northern Ireland MLAs 1998–2003
Members of Ards Borough Council
Ulster Unionist Party MLAs
Royal Ulster Constabulary officers
People from Enniskillen